The Industrial Relations Court of Australia was a short-lived Chapter III Court whose jurisdiction was transferred from the Federal Court in 1994, and transferred back in 1997. In the words of former Chief Justice Robert French, "The tide went in, the tide went out". Every judge had a concurrent appointment in the Federal Court. Despite the transfer of jurisdiction, any existing matter or appeal from an existing matter remained in the Industrial Relations Court of Australia, with the result that the last case was not finally disposed of until 2005/6. The Court was not to be abolished until after the last judge had retired. The last judge to retire was Anthony North on 11 September 2018. The court was formally abolished on 1 March 2021.

The court was the latest in a line of specialist federal courts dealing with industrial relations matters, being the Commonwealth Court of Conciliation and Arbitration (1904–1956), whose court and arbitration functions were divided as a result of the  Boilermakers' case, succeeded by Commonwealth Industrial Court (1956–1973), which was renamed as the Australian Industrial Court (1973–1977). The last remaining judge of the Australian Industrial Court, Ray Northrop was appointed to the new court.

The creation of a specialist court was controversial, with academics Breen Creighton and Andrew Stewart stating that it was not clear that the creation of the court would serve any useful purpose. One of those opposed to the creation of the court was Federal Court judge Murray Wilcox who was subsequently offered appointment as Chief Justice. Wilcox reminded the Attorney-General, Michael Lavarch, of his opposition, to which Lavarch responded that Wilcox's knowledge of the pitfalls would help the court to avoid them.

List of judges

References

Australian superior courts
Commonwealth of Australia courts and tribunals
1994 establishments in Australia
Labour relations in Australia
Courts and tribunals established in 1994